The Balfour Declaration of 1926, issued by the 1926 Imperial Conference of British Empire leaders in London, was named after Arthur Balfour, who was Lord President of the Council. It declared the United Kingdom and the Dominions to be:

The Inter-Imperial Relations Committee, chaired by Balfour, drew up the document preparatory to its unanimous approval by the imperial prime ministers on 15 November 1926. It was first proposed by South African Prime Minister J. B. M. Hertzog and Canadian Prime Minister William Lyon Mackenzie King.

The declaration accepted the growing political and diplomatic independence of the Dominions in the years after World War I. It also recommended that the governors-general, the representatives of the King in each dominion, should no longer also serve automatically as the representative of the British government in diplomatic relations between the countries. In following years, high commissioners were gradually appointed, whose duties were soon recognised to be virtually identical to those of an ambassador. The first such British high commissioner was appointed to Canada in 1928.

The conclusions of the Imperial Conference of 1926 were re-stated by the 1930 conference and incorporated in the Statute of Westminster of December 1931. In the statute, the British Parliament provided that it would not enact a law which applied to a Dominion as part of the law of that Dominion, unless the law expressly stated that the Dominion government had requested and consented to the enactment of that law.

References

Further reading

External links
Transcript of the Declaration

British Empire
History of the Commonwealth of Nations
Commonwealth realms
Monarchy in the Irish Free State
Legal history of Canada
1926 in the United Kingdom
1926 in British law
1926 in international relations
Proclamations
1926 in the British Empire
1926 documents
November 1926 events